Didymodon gelidus is a species of mosses that grows in Antarctica and on the South Shetland Islands.

References

The Antarctic mosses: with special reference to the South Shetland Islands

Flora of Antarctica
Pottiaceae